A hydrostatic loop, though not often used in plumbing practice, is an arrangement of pipes formed into a vertical loop to prevent backflow of water within the plumbing potable water system. Since a siphon has a maximum height that it can work (about 33 feet), a hydrostatic loop is built higher than 33 feet. There are several ways to prevent siphonage and an undesirable backflow of the water in a plumbing system.
 Vented loops

References

See also 
 backflow prevention
 Pressure vacuum breaker
 Double check valve
 Chemigation valve
 Reduced pressure zone device
 Atmospheric vacuum breaker

Plumbing valves